Carol Lou Nugent (born July 7, 1937) is an American actress who began her career as a child. Nugent appeared in over 20 feature films and 11 television programs during the 1940s, 1950s and 1960s. Her 1959 marriage to actor Nick Adams ended with his death in 1968, before their divorce had been finalised.

Biography

Early life
Nugent was born in Los Angeles, the elder daughter of Lucille and Carl Nugent. Her father was a property master for MGM and her mother later became a talent agent, managing Carol's career along with that of her younger sister Judy Nugent.

Hollywood career
Nugent was a child actor, first appearing on screen at age seven in Secret Command (1944). She played small parts in four more movies over the next three years and in one of these, she and her sister Judy portrayed the same character at different ages. She was in a few popular hits, including Cheaper by the Dozen (1950) and Belles on Their Toes (1952) but as a child actor never quite made the transition from bit player to larger roles. However, as a teen Nugent grew into ingenue parts on television and in B-films. She was a supporting actress throughout her career, which tapered off sharply after she married and had children.

Personal life
Nugent married actor Nick Adams.

In a 1961 interview Adams said, "Carol is my good-luck charm. My first real success, the turn of the tide, came right after I fell in love with her. Then I formed my own production company and we sold The Rebel." However, in the same interview Nugent said, "Let's not overdo the sweetness and light. Naturally, Nick and I had our problems at the start". Gossip columnist Rona Barrett later wrote that Nugent "was one of the most refreshing wives in the entire community."

John G. Stephens and Nugent married in 2002; Stephens died in 2018.

Filmography

 Secret Command (1944) ... as Joan
 Little Mister Jim (1946) ... as Clara
 The Sea of Grass (1947) ... as Sarah Beth at age 7
 Green Dolphin Street (1947) ... as Veronica at age 7
 It Had To Be You (1947) ... as Victoria at age 6
 Cheaper by the Dozen (1950 film) ... as Young Girl
 Trail of Robin Hood (1950) ... as Sis McGonigle
 Here Comes the Groom (1951) ... as McGonigle Girl
 It's a Big Country (1951) ... as Girl
 Belles on Their Toes (1952) ... as Lily Gilbreth
 The Story of Will Rogers (1952) ... as young Mary Rogers
 The Lusty Men (1952) ... as Rusty Davis
 Fast Company (1953) ... as Jigger Parkson
 Ma and Pa Kettle at Home (1954) ... as Nancy Kettle
 Drum Beat (1954) ... as Young Girl
 The Unguarded Moment (1956) ... as Dancer
 Lost, Lonely and Vicious (1958) ... as Pinkie
 The Badlanders (1958) ... as stagecoach passenger's daughter
 Inside the Mafia (1959) ... as Sandy Balcom
 The Crimson Kimono (1959) ... as Girl
 Vice Raid (1960) ... as Louise Hudson

Television credits
 The Gene Autry Show: "Return of Maverick Dan" (1951) ....as Barbara "Bobbie" Blake
 TV Reader's Digest: "If I Were Rich" (1955)
 The Life and Legend of Wyatt Earp: "Shootin' Woman" (1957) ....as Young Woman
 The 20th Century-Fox Hour: "Threat To A Happy Ending" (1957) ....as Anne
 Death Valley Days: "The Calico Dog" (1957) ....as Nancy Drake
 The Adventures of Wild Bill Hickok: "Town Without Law" (1958) ....as Sue Lightfoot
 Mickey Spillane's Mike Hammer: "That Schoolgirl Complex" (1958) ....as Claudia
 Perry Mason: "The Case of the Fraudulent Foto" (1959) ....as Helen Preston
 The Millionaire: "Millionaire Charles Bradwell" (1959) ....as sister
 The Rebel: "Yellow Hair" (1959) ....as Indian Girl
 Family Affair: "A Matter Of Tonsils" (1968) ....as Miss Jones

References

External links
 
 
 Jeb Stuart Adams at the Internet Movie Database

1937 births
American child actresses
American film actresses
American television actresses
Living people
Actresses from Los Angeles
21st-century American women